Slapping or smacking refers to striking a person with the open palm of the hand, in a movement known as a slap or smack. A backhand uses the back of the hand instead of the palm.

Etymology and definitions
The word slap was first recorded in 1632, probably as a form of onomatopoeia. It shares its beginning consonants with several other English words related to violence, such as "slash", "slay", and "slam". The word is found in several English colloquialisms, such as, "slap fight", "slap-happy", "slapshot", "slapstick", "slap on the wrist" (as a mild punishment), "slap in the face" (as an insult or, alternatively, as a reproof against a lewd or insulting comment), and "slap on the back" (an expression of friendship or congratulations).

In music 

In jazz and other styles of music, the term refers to the action of pulling an instrument's strings back and allowing them to smack the instrument.

Bitch slap 
"Bitch slap" is slang phrase that dates back to the 1990s. It means to slap someone hard for being insolent or unproductive in order to show dissatisfaction, contempt, or disrespect with the goal of gaining dominance over them and reducing them to submission.

Happy slapping 
For about five years beginning in 2004, happy slapping became a UK fad. Happy slapping is the phenomenon whereby kids assault someone while being taped by a friend on their mobile phone: afterwards the video is uploaded to a site like YouTube.  Media coverage of the alleged trend led to a nationwide moral panic, including a call by one member of parliament for schools to block mobile phone signals.

Usage and meaning

The purpose of a slap is often to humiliate, more than injure. A "slap in the face" is a common idiom, dating back to the late 1800s, that means to rebuke, rebuff or insult.

In his 2004 text The Naked Woman: A Study of the Female Body, anthropologist Desmond Morris defines what he calls the "cheek slap," which he describes as "the classic action of a lady responding to the unwelcome attentions of a male." Morris categorizes the cheek slap as a "display blow", meaning one that is impossible to ignore but doesn't cause much damage.

The word "slap" is frequently used to minimize the perceived violence of an act, even if the act was especially severe. One person may hit another across the face and injure them severely, but in calling it a slap, it may seem less severe, since slapping is often associated with minor violence.

Cultural aspects
Slapping is viewed differently by different cultures. In many countries, such as Iceland, slapping a child is viewed as a form of physical abuse, and is illegal (see corporal punishment of children), whereas in others, such as England, it is seen by only some parents as abusive, and even then only moderately so. The slapping of children in England and Northern Ireland remains legal as of 2023, despite being illegal in the two other UK constituent countries of Scotland (since 2020) and Wales (since 2022). A 1998 Indian study found a high rate of approval for husbands slapping their wives, particularly among husbands and middle class Indians.

In some cultures, when girls menstruate for the first time, their mothers often slap them across the face, a cultural tradition thought by some to signify the difficulties of life as a woman.

Studies have shown that although Americans frown upon domestic violence regardless of whether the perpetrator is male or female, generally they are more accepting of minor violence, such as slapping, when it is perpetrated by a woman against a man or vice versa. Women who inflict minor acts of violence on their male partners have a higher-than-normal probability of being severely assaulted by those partners, and domestic violence experts therefore advise at-risk women to refrain from even minor acts of physical aggression against their partners. It has been suggested by Michael Lamb that both men and women who are violent toward their spouses are more likely to be so with their children as well.

In India, the "insult slap" is a political maneuver used to express disapproval of ideas of a particular public figure or politician.

Slapping is very often portrayed in films and television programs. For example, in Slap Her... She's French girls and women typically slap boys, men and other females who offend them in some way and humiliate them.

Slapping contests
In Russian bodybuilding championships, slapping contests are often held between contestants where opponents stand across from each other and exchange blows until one concedes or is knocked out. Power Slap, a slap fighting competition televised in the United States on TBS, debuted in January 2023.

Slapping incidents 
 The Will Smith slapping Chris Rock incident at the 94th annual Academy Awards Ceremony in 2022 sparked a large amount of controversy.

See also

 Battery (crime)
 Bullying
 Child abuse
 Corporal punishment in the home
 The Slap, 2008 novel

References

Strikes (martial arts)
Abuse
Bullying